Jęczniki Wielkie  is a village in the administrative district of Gmina Człuchów, within Człuchów County, Pomeranian Voivodeship, in northern Poland. It is located within the historic region of Pomerania.

The village has a population of 275.

Jęczniki Wielkie was a royal village of the Polish Crown, administratively located in the Człuchów County in the Pomeranian Voivodeship.

References

Villages in Człuchów County